Claire Duke married name Claire Turley is an Australian international Lawn Bowls player.

Bowls career
In 2010, she won the silver medal in the triples at the 2010 Commonwealth Games in the Women's triples event.

She has won two silver medals at the Asia Pacific Bowls Championships.

Personal life
She married fellow Australian bowls international Wayne Turley in 2013.

References 

Living people
1983 births
Bowls players at the 2010 Commonwealth Games
Australian female bowls players
Commonwealth Games medallists in lawn bowls
Bowls World Champions
People from Tongala
Commonwealth Games silver medallists for Australia
21st-century Australian women
Medallists at the 2010 Commonwealth Games